Eritrichium nanum, the arctic alpine forget-me-not or king-of-the-Alps, is a circumpolar alpine cushion plant which occurs in the North American Rocky mountains as well as the European Alps. It grows at elevations of 10,000 feet in an environment of acid rocks, snow gullies and receding glaciers.

References

Eritrichium nanum, King of the Alps

Boraginoideae
Alpine flora
Flora of the Alps
Flora of the Carpathians